Whitburn Academy is a mixed secondary school in Whitburn, West Lothian, Scotland.

Press Coverage and Achievements 
In December 2017, students from Whitburn Academy used various fundraising methods, such as a non-dress code day and other events to buy a defibrilator for the school. The defibrilator was bought from ALBA care. The students from Whitburn Academy also designed the logo for the station at Whitburn Cross.

In March 2018, S3 pupil Rachel Mann won the 21st Schuh shoe design competition, in which schools all across West Lothian competed in. She won the grand prize of the Schuh trophy and a year's worth of free shoes.

References 

Secondary schools in West Lothian
Educational institutions established in 1967
1967 establishments in Scotland
Whitburn, West Lothian